The bass gehu (低音革胡; pinyin: dīyīngéhú, ; also called digehu or beigehu 倍革胡, literally "bass gehu") is a Chinese bowed string instrument in the huqin family. It was developed by Yang Yusen along with the gehu in the 20th century.  It has four strings and is the Chinese equivalent of the double bass.

See also
Gehu
Laruan
Dihu
Dahu
Guqin
Traditional Chinese musical instruments
String

External links
Diyingehu page

Chinese musical instruments
Drumhead lutes
Bowed instruments
Contrabass instruments